Nicolae Crevedia (born Niculae Ion Cârstea; December 7, 1902 – November 5, 1978) was a Romanian journalist, poet and novelist, father of the writer-politician Eugen Barbu. Of Muntenian peasant roots, which shaped his commitment to agrarian and then far-right politics, as well as his dialectal poetry and humorous prose, he preferred bohemian life to an academic career. As a writer at Gândirea, Crevedia became a follower of Nichifor Crainic, and worked with him on various other press venues, from Calendarul to Sfarmă-Piatră. Turning to fascism, he sympathized with the Iron Guard, and, in the late 1930s, contributed to the press campaigns vilifying ideological enemies, while also putting out novels, reportage pieces, and anthologies. His affair with the Iron Guard muse Marta Rădulescu was at the center of a literary scandal, and was fictionalized by Crevedia in one of his novels.

Fluent in Bulgarian, Crevedia became press attaché in the Kingdom of Bulgaria under the National Legionary State, serving to 1946. He was sidelined by the Romanian communist regime in the late 1940s and early '50s, when he was employed as a minor clerk. With his mentor Crainic, Crevedia contributed to the propaganda review Glasul Patriei. He was more fully recovered under national communism in the 1960s, and lived to see the communist ascendancy of his son Barbu. His rural-themed poetry, much of it echoing Tudor Arghezi, Ion Minulescu and Sergei Yesenin, was reprinted in various installments to 1977. It is regarded by critics as a minor but picturesque contribution to modern Romanian literature.

Biography

Early life
His parents were the peasants Ion Cârstea and his wife Floarea née Antonescu, described the poet as: "well-to-do people of the plow. I am the first one in my family to have worn a necktie." Crevedia also saw himself as "purely Romanian and from a fully Romanian region", but was rumored to be of Bulgarian ethnicity. His birth name was Niculae (or Nicolae) Ion Cârstea, although he later had it officially changed to N. Crevedia, his pseudonym of choice. One of two sons born to the Cârsteas, he sponsored his younger brother complete a high school education, while his older sisters (one of whom had 17 children of her own) remained largely illiterate.

After completing primary school in his native village, his high school education was interrupted by World War I. Niculae was mobilized as a telephone operator at the mayor's office in Crevedia Mare. He witnessed first-hand the Romanian defeat of November 1916, when Vlașca and all of Muntenia fell to the Central Powers; his father was drafted into the 45th Infantry Regiment, and withdrew with it to Iepurești. With Floarea and his sister Oana, Crevedia traveled there, meeting the caravans of refugees heading for Bucharest, the national capital. As revealed by his private notebooks, Niculae witnessed his father's humiliation by a young platoon leader, as well as his marching into the infantry counterattack of Bălăriile (part of the larger Battle of Bucharest).

Notoriously philandering into his old age, Crevedia boasted that his first sexual encounters were war widows. Upon the end of war, he walked to Bucharest in order to complete his education. In 1923–1924, he was a clerk at the War Ministry, making his published debut in 1924, in the journal Cultul Eroilor Noștri. Crevedia graduated from Saint Sava High School in 1925, and then pursued a degree in Slavic studies at the University of Bucharest. Although he learned Latin and the rudiments of Bulgarian, he never in fact took his degree. He belonged to the sociological research teams led by Dimitrie Gusti and worked for a while as a substitute teacher, then as a private tutor.

Moving between rented apartments, Crevedia had a sexual relationship with one of his landladies, resulting in the birth of son, the future novelist Eugen Barbu. According to eyewitnesses, father and son resembled each other perfectly. Crevedia recognized him as his own, but preferred to be discreet about his existence. Formally registered as the son of State Railways carpenter Nicolae Barbu, Eugen himself publicly denied his origins, but later admitted to them in private.

Complaining that teaching and studying made him a "misfit", Crevedia took up professional journalism, writing for Curentul, Epoca and Mișcarea; other magazines that ran his work include Rampa, Vremea, Adevărul Literar și Artistic, Bilete de Papagal, Azi and Revista Fundațiilor Regale. In 1930, Universuls literary supplement hosted his interview with writer Vasile Voiculescu, in which the latter spoke about his mystical experiences. Crevedia's first book, Epigrame ("Epigrams"), was published in 1930, followed in 1933 by poetry collection Bulgări și stele ("Clumps and Stars"). After frequenting the modernist club at Sburătorul, he became one of the most dedicated followers of the poet-theologian Nichifor Crainic, and "one of the most constant" contributors to his magazine, Gândirea.

Crevedia saw himself as "a man of the right, like my father before me". In his definition, this meant both "ardent" Romanian nationalism and calls for "social justice", with particular emphasis on "the peasant issue": "The [peasantry] is rotten with illness, still ignorant, morally ruined, and political parties have turned it into bedlam." Drifting toward Crainic's neo-traditionalist and Romanian Orthodox far-right, he served as editor-in-chief for the dailies Calendarul and Porunca Vremii. He also published in Cuvântul reportage pieces which documented the effects of the Great Depression on the Bucharest proletariat.

Crevedia followed up with humorous, satirical prose volumes: Bacalaureatul lui Puiu ("Puiu's Baccalaureate", 1933), Dragoste cu termen redus ("Short-term Love", 1934); together with Al. С. Calotescu-Neicu, he published Antologia epigramei românești ("An Anthology of Romanian Epigrams", 1933). He won the Romanian Writers' Society prize in 1934 and enjoyed commercial success, but was soon after accused of plagiarism by his Calendarul colleague Pan M. Vizirescu and by the epigrammatist Paul I. Papadopol. One of the accusations referred to Crevedia's translation of a Bulgarian poem, which appeared in both Viața Literară and Frize. The piece was later exposed as nearly identical to one of Crevedia's own works; when asked to justify himself, he noted that both poems were his own, and that he had presented one as a translation piece so as to ensure that I. Valerian would publish it.

Iron Guard sympathizer

This period also brought him and Crainic into contact with the radically antisemitic Iron Guard. In December 1933, Crevedia was one of the intellectuals who protested in Axa magazine against the government's decision to ban the Guard. During 1935, he was present at Maglavit, one of several Guard sympathizers claiming to have witnessed the religious miracles performed by shepherd Petrache Lupu. In Porunca Vremii, he claimed that Lupu had cured his own uncontrollable blinking. He penned panegyrics to the Guard's Captain Corneliu Zelea Codreanu, an "extraordinary organizer" and "profound thinker who reflects on the current issues facing our nation." In his words, Codreanu, an example of "virility, faith, and sacrifice, [had] managed to make us believe that this Nation has not disappeared." He alternated this cult with that of King Carol II and his "Prince Charming" son, Michael I. Nonetheless, Vizirescu accused him of being a disloyal "servant" of Crainic and an inconsistent, corrupt, ally of the Iron Guard. Reportedly, Crevedia complained to his peers that Crainic was exploiting him.

Crevedia had another publicized row with the literary critic and historian George Călinescu—later, he acknowledged Călinescu as a "titan of his generation" and "one of our great prose writers", but still criticized him for "work[ing], year upon year, for the Jews". He also applied his polemical energy to more personal causes, for instance attacking a putative former lover, Marta Rădulescu (daughter of the author Dan "Justus" Rădulescu), with a lampoon piece in Viața Literară. A resident of Cluj, she was locally famous as the editor of Revista Mea, a mouthpiece of the Iron Guard. They had allegedly been due to be married, and Rădulescu even wrote a short novel on the topic, but she eventually rejected him. In such texts, Crevedia accused Marta of having stolen his writings—a claim dismissed by Vizirescu and later also by researcher Ion Chinezu. In some of his notes on the scandal, Crevedia also claimed that Marta's ghostwriter was her father "Justus".

Crevedia took his final revenge on Rădulescu by having her satirized in the 1936 novel Buruieni de dragoste ("Love Weeds"). Some two years after the scandal, Crevedia married Maria Mutu, in a religious ceremony with Crainic as godfather. Maria was a niece of the Gândirea novelist Gib Mihăescu, in whose house she lived before marriage; she worked as a professor of French and Romanian. The couple had two daughters, Ioana and Diana. A flight enthusiast, Crevedia continued to travel throughout Europe, and announced by 1937 that he was planning to publish a travelogue of his trips through the Balkans, a theatrical version of Bacalaureatul lui Puiu, and an anthology of Bulgarian poetry, alongside a new novel, Mămăligă—referencing the folk dish. His play was reportedly finished, and Crevedia failed at convincing Camil Petrescu to include it in the National Theater program. Two other volumes of his poetry appeared around that time: Maria (1938), named after his wife, and Dă-mi înapoi grădinile ("Give Me Back My Gardens", 1939).

Still at Porunca Vremii, Crevedia responded to left-wing adversaries of Crainic, primarily the novelist Mihail Sadoveanu, director of Adevărul. During the far-right's anti-Masonic campaign of 1936–1938, he mocked Sadoveanu's obesity and urged him to shoot himself. In early 1937, at the height of the Spanish Civil War, he contributed to Iron Guard martyrology, depicting Romanian volunteers as "killed for Christ and the Latin race", seeds of "the iron phalanx of tomorrow." However, later that year he and Porunca Vremii had switched their allegiances to the National Christian Party (PNC), which took fourth place in the December elections. On January 1, 1938, Crevedia published an editorial calling for the PNC to take over and inaugurate a "new era" of antisemitic conservatism.

Before World War II, Crevedia was mainly contributing to Universul, which was increasingly favorable to fascism. In its literary supplement, he issued calls for a nationalist art, purified of "unhealthy, imported currents". As noted by the satirist Neagu Rădulescu, these were prosperous times for Crevedia, who had a firm contract with publisher Petre Georgescu-Delafras. At the time, he was keeping the aspiring novelist Constantin Virgil Gheorghiu as his salaried secretary and his țuțăr ("yes-man"), allowing him to wear his old clothes. At the Writers' Society, he notes, Crevedia acted as a person of importance, but was told off by other writers. As he moved up in his career, Crevedia built a modern home in his village, which he donated to his sister. He continued to rely on rented housing, but purchased himself residential land in Băneasa, where, in 1940, he still hoped to build himself a family villa.

Under the Iron Guard's National Legionary State regime of late 1940, he directed Crainic's own fascist newspaper, Sfarmă-Piatră. In mid 1940 the Ion Antonescu government sent him as a press attaché in Sofia. Serving there to 1946, he put together an edition on Romanian culture for Serdika and published Cultura românească și centrul ei: Bucureștii ("Romanian Culture and Its Center: Bucharest", 1943). He also began translating Bulgarian poetry from the original, in the hope of publishing it, and also arranged for "an esteemed Bulgarian colleague" to work on similar translations from the Romanian. No such work ever so print. He continued to publish in Universul, including 1941 verses which deplored the cession of Northern Transylvania to Romania's nominal ally, Regency Hungary, and claimed that Greater Romania would emerge again. In 1943, he penned in Viața Basarabiei an eulogy to his fellow poet and friend, Octav Sargețiu, whom he thus brought to public attention.

Sidelining and return
Although a fascist, Crevedia was spared during the first purge of the Writers' Society that followed the August 1944 Coup. In July 1945, the Petru Groza government assessed his case and ruled: "From [Crevedia's] articles in Porunca Vremii one can discern a fully antisemitic campaign with incitement and exhortation of the most violent actions. With his writing he serviced Hitlerism and fascism, popularizing hooligan, anti-democratic, frames of mind. Since Nicolae Crevedia's actively fascist journalism is limited to the year 1939 and given that in later years he stopped putting out such articles, sanction shall be limited to a ban on activities, for no longer than 5 years."

Following the establishment of Romanian communist regime in 1948, he found himself shunned from mainstream literature, and continued to write, secretly, poems which explicitly contradicted the guidelines of socialist realism. He resorted to informal channels, and, with Virgil Carianopol, Ion Buzdugan and Radu D. Rosetti, began frequenting the literary parties held at Ion Larian Postolache's home, on Dobroteasa Street, Bucharest. This salon also grouped younger writers, including C. D. Zeletin and Crevedia's own son, Eugen. According to one account, Postolache arranged for Crevedia to meet his son: they had been aware of each other, but never actually met, and Crevedia had heard that Barbu was reduced to poverty. Barbu became more acceptable to the regime, and published in 1957 his own novel The Pit, part of which fictionalizes Crevedia's youth. According to a persistent rumor, the whole book was actually ghostwritten by Crevedia.

Crevedia clerked at the virology institute (1955–1956) and at the Romanian Academy's linguistics institute (1957), before being called on by the regime to edit Glasul Patriei magazine, from 1957 to 1972. As noted by critic Ovid Crohmălniceanu, the latter enterprise, publishing propaganda aimed at the Romanian diaspora, was set up by former political prisoners Crainic and George Ivașcu, with Securitate agents as supervisors. According to Crohmălniceanu, Crevedia and others, supposed to show the world that freedom of speech existed behind the Iron Curtain, were not in fact "old defenders of democracy", but "had rather filled [with their names] the old fascist press."

Following relative liberalization and national communism under Nicolae Ceaușescu, Crevedia returned to the public eye with a Luceafărul article on his meetings with Gib Mihăescu (1965), followed by the self-selected anthology Versuri ("Verse", 1968). In 1969, with Vizirescu and Carianopol, alongside the Romanian Communist Party envoy Paul Niculescu-Mizil, he attended the official banquet marking Crainic's 80th birthday. Reportedly, the same year he was also the first reviewer of Barbu's other novel, Princepele, which he found to be a masterpiece.

Despite being left-wing and Jewish, Crohmălniceanu discovered that he liked the poetry of both Crainic and Crevedia, and made efforts to have it revisited; as he recounts, these were received with indignation by the communist poet Eugen Jebeleanu, who called Crevedia a "hooligan". Crevedia himself was moved by Crohmălniceanu's work, and the two, later joined by Crainic, had cordial meetings in the early 1970s. Before his 1978 death, Crevedia put out the anthology Epigramiști români de ieri și de azi ("Romanian Epigrammatists Past and Present", 1975) and included his previously unpublished verses in Vinul sălbatic ("Wild Wine", 1977).

Crevedia was survived by Barbu and his two half-sisters. Diana Crevedia, married Cristev, worked for the Museum of Romanian Literature and was an editor of Manuscriptum. A translator of works by her more famous writer brother, she later emigrated to Italy. In 2018, she and her sister provided the military magazine România Eroică some fragments from their father's unpublished Mămăligă. Well regarded by the Ceaușescu regime, Barbu remained active at the forefront of Romanian politics and literature through to the 1989 Revolution. A subset of protochronist ideology, his cell of pro-Ceaușescu writers was sometimes known as the "Barbu Group", with Barbu himself co-opted on the Communist Party Central Committee; however, his reputation as an author suffered after revelations of plagiarism, and he was sidelined in the 1970s. As editor of Săptămîna, he cultivated poet Corneliu Vadim Tudor, famous for introducing antisemitic themes to the national-communist discourse. Following the Revolution, Barbu, Tudor and Iosif Constantin Drăgan set up an ultra-nationalist Greater Romania Party.

Work

Poetry
From early on, Crevedia created a reputation as a haughty, blustering countryside poet and as a prose writer inclined toward the licentious; gradually, his lyricism became purer and more temperate, in line with an authentic peasant traditionalism. With Aron Cotruș, Radu Gyr, and other Gândirea poets, he exulted hajduk life, "bursting into explosions of vitality." The Gândirea house critic, Ovidiu Papadima, referred to Crevedia as a traveler on the "imperial road of poetry", emanating "warm and full light". When dealing with the poetic universe of Bucharest suburbia, Crevedia's work was infused with influences from Tudor Arghezi, who, Călinescu argues, was a "prototype", particularly with his Mildew Flowers cycle. Nevertheless, the critic points out that the thick Wallachian dialect of Crevedia's prose was only suited for comedic situations and "facile subjects", not "great lyricism". He viewed Crevedia as particularly hampered by his borrowings from the humorous verse of Ion Minulescu and his own "prankish temperament".

Crevedia and his friend George Dorul Dumitrescu both regarded Arghezi as "the prince of writers". Also supporting the hypothesis that Crevedia's work was largely shaped by Mildew Flowers, critic Șerban Cioculescu saw additional echoes from Sergei Yesenin, particularly in the "daring crudeness" of their shared vocabulary. This view was toned down by poet Mihai Beniuc, who though a direct comparison between the Romanian and Russian poet was exaggerated. Yesenian themes were traced by Cioculescu to poems such as Ceai dansant ("Tea Party"), which displays nostalgia for the countryside:

The modernist Eugen Lovinescu describes Crevedia as the most accomplished traditionalist, and notes that Bulgări și stele would have been a fully original work had it not been for Mildew Flowers. Crevedia's art was "neither folkloric nor a pastel, neither bucolic nor a fairy tale, and yet a rural poetry, or rather a plebeian poetry [...] of great plastic vigor, its vocabulary cruel to the brink of vulgarity and ugliness, but authentic". According to C. D. Zeletin, Crevedia had a "rural obsession", but actually disliked Romanian folklore; behind the "impression of aggressiveness and primitivism", he was secretly inspired by Arghezi's more cultivated and urbanite literature. Zeletin praised in particular Crevedia's use of alliteration and experiments with poetic language, arguing that they render a "savant charm". Călinescu also noted that Crevedia's poetic homage to his father as a man "seemingly made from stumps and soil", had "a certain xylographic vigor"; Lovinescu also called it an "admirable woodcut". Călinescu identified even "purer vibrations" in stanzas such as:

Prose
According to reviewer Silviu Bardeș, Crevedia's ten sketches in Bacalaureatul lui Puiu had "lively dialogue" and "verve", but alternated between the "remarkable" and the "salacious". The title story was "a fine portrait of today's educated guttersnipes." Dragoste cu termen redus, a comedic novel, shows the myopic cadet Vasile Țâgăran faking an illness to escape the dullness of military life, only to fall in love with his nurse, Aurora, and finding out that his unrequited affection is much more unbearable. Toward the end of the book, Aurora, having rejected his advances, is shown making passionate love to a street-smart Rom recruit. As noted by Lovinescu, both Bacalaureatul lui Puiu and Dragoste cu termen redus were complicit to the point of being "vulgar", and overdone: "Comedic situations are exploited mercilessly, persistently, gleefully, amplified and unchecked. For something that Gh. Brăescu will obtain on one page, [Crevedia] uses ten."

The political novel and memoir Buruieni de dragoste depicts Sanda Marinescu, a thinly disguised version of Marta Rădulescu; Revista Mea becomes Revista Revistelor, and "Justus" is Professor Barbu Marinescu, a Freemason. The journalist Trestieru, standing in for Crevedia, slowly discovered that Sanda's political prose is actually the work of her father, and also that the latter has commonplace political opinions, dictated by sociology, democracy, and Fordism. Reviewing the work in 1937, folklorist Iosif Bâtiu argued: "The nationalist youth will easily recognize in the novel's characters, admirably contoured as they are, many pioneers of the nationalist movement, as well as its detractors, the latter viewed in all their spiritual emptiness." This opinion was contrasted by that of Pagini Literare columnist Romulus Demetrescu, who suggested that Crevedia wrote a "lampoon [...] against Marta Rădulescu 's family", "doing away with all discretion and delicacy". He found especially "upsetting" and indecent that Crevedia had disguised other known characters under transparent pseudonyms, suggesting that the author was suffering from megalomania.

Another traditionalist reviewer, Grigore Bugarin, argued that Buruieni de dragoste was written in "masterly Romanian, with unexpected charm. [...] The protagonists come alive. As soon as you close the book, you may close your eyes and hear them speak, watch them gesticulate." The novel, Bugarin claimed, "is a lifelike expression of today's Romanian bourgeoisie." Agreeing with Crevedia's politics, but also with his ideal of the "intellectual woman", Bâtiu concluded: "In this literary era of ours, when so many indecent and pornographic books are shamelessly published by authors of dubious origins, these Love Weeds settle in as a gentle breeze". On the modernist side, Lovinescu also argued that Buruieni de dragoste was Crevedia's most accomplished work. "Poorly structured" and "embarrassing for those familiar with literary life", it was nonetheless more analytical, and had "a poetic note and vigorous expression".

Notes

References
Lucian Boia, Capcanele istoriei. Elita intelectuală românească între 1930 și 1950. Bucharest: Humanitas, 2012.  
George Călinescu, Istoria literaturii române de la origini pînă în prezent. Bucharest: Editura Minerva, 1986.
Nicolae Crevedia, "De la seceră la baionetă", in România Eroică, Vol. XX, Issue 1, 2018, pp. 26–31.
Ovid Crohmălniceanu, 
Literatura română între cele două războaie mondiale, Vol. I. Bucharest: Editura Minerva, 1972.  
Amintiri deghizate. Bucharest: Editura Nemira, 1994.  
Niculae Gheran, Arta de a fi păgubaș. 3: Îndărătul cortinei. Bucharest: Editura Biblioteca Bucureștilor, 2012.  
Radu Ioanid, "Extracts from Characteristics of Rumanian Fascism", in Roger Griffin, Matthew Feldman (eds.), Fascism (Critical Concepts in Political Science). Vol. IV, pp. 119–141. London & New York City: Routledge, 2004.  
Eugen Lovinescu, Istoria literaturii române contemporane. Chișinău: Editura Litera, 1998. 
Z. Ornea, Anii treizeci. Extrema dreaptă românească. Bucharest: Editura Fundației Culturale Române, 1995.  
Neagu Rădulescu, Turnul Babel. Bucharest: Cugetarea-Georgescu Delafras, 1944.
Florin Rotaru (ed.), "Cronici literare" and "Studii literare", in Serghei Esenin, Zaharia Stancu, Moscova cârciumăreasă. Ediție bibliofilă, pp. 267–338. Bucharest: Editura Biblioteca Bucureștilor, 1999. 
Katherine Verdery, National Ideology under Socialism: Identity and Cultural Politics in Ceaușescu's Romania. Berkeley etc.: University of California Press, 1995.  

1902 births
1978 deaths
Romanian male poets
20th-century Romanian poets
Gândirea
Romanian epigrammatists
Romanian novelists
Romanian humorists
Romanian travel writers
Romanian anthologists
20th-century memoirists
Romanian memoirists
20th-century translators
Romanian translators
Translators to Romanian
Translators from Bulgarian
Romanian magazine editors
Romanian newspaper editors
Romanian activist journalists
Romanian agrarianists
Romanian fascists
Romanian civil servants
Romanian public relations people
Romanian propagandists
Romanian diplomats
People from Giurgiu County
Members of the Romanian Orthodox Church
Romanian military personnel of World War I
Saint Sava National College alumni
Romanian expatriates in Bulgaria
Romanian people of World War II
People involved in plagiarism controversies
Censorship in Romania